Moravské Lieskové is a village and municipality in Nové Mesto nad Váhom District in the Trenčín Region of western Slovakia.

History
In historical records the village was first mentioned in 1398.

Geography
The municipality lies at an altitude of 249 metres and covers an area of 36.421 km2. It has a population of about 2484 people.

References

External links

 Official page
http://www.statistics.sk/mosmis/eng/run.html

Villages and municipalities in Nové Mesto nad Váhom District